Make Up in Love is the eighth studio album by American country music artist Doug Stone. Released in 1999 as his only album for Atlantic Records, it features the singles "Make up in Love,” a cover of R.B. Greaves' "Take a Letter, Maria", and “Surprise." The title track was the only one of these to chart in the Top 40 on the Billboard country charts. The track "The Difference Between a Woman and a Man" was later recorded by Josh Turner on his 2003 debut album Long Black Train.

Track listing

Personnel
Bobby All - acoustic guitar
Pat Buchanan - electric guitar
Mark Casstevens - acoustic guitar
Jim Collins - background vocals
Kenny Greenberg - electric guitar
Rob Hajacos - fiddle
Owen Hale - drums
Liana Manis - background vocals
Michael Rhodes - bass guitar
Mike Rojas - piano
John Wesley Ryles - background vocals
Scotty Sanders - steel guitar, Dobro
Leslie Satcher - background vocals on "The Heart Holds On"
Doug Stone - lead vocals
Willie Weeks - bass guitar
Lonnie Wilson - drums
Glenn Worf - bass guitar
Strings by The Nashville String Machine

Chart performance

1999 albums
Atlantic Records albums
Doug Stone albums